Langsam may refer to:

 Langsam, a German tempo marking for slow music
 Marcel Langsam (1891–1979), Luxembourgian gymnast
 Walter C. Langsam (1916–1985), American academic
 Langsam (train), the name of a passenger train in Indonesia

See also 
 Freck Langsam, a 2010 German film